Free Democrats, previously known as Our Georgia – Free Democrats, is a political party in Georgia founded by Irakli Alasania, Georgia's former envoy to the United Nations, on 16 July 2009. The party was in opposition to the government led by Mikheil Saakashvili and his United National Movement.

For the 2012 elections, it was part of the Georgian Dream alliance that won the election against the United National Movement. However, the party left the governing coalition on 5 November 2014.

The Free Democrats support a presidential republic with a strong parliament, an independent judicial system, and a wide range of authorized local authorities.

Its economic objectives are a competitive, free-market economy and the establishment of sustainable economic growth, poverty reduction, job creation and social protection systems. To this end, the parties should consider strengthening the institutions of private property and property rights, privacy, and personal initiative to promote healthy competition.

The party's foreign policy priorities are the country's full integration into the European and Euro-Atlantic structures, deepening and strengthening of good neighborly relations with the countries of the region, and improving and strengthening the country's defense.

Electoral performance

See also 
:Category:Free Democrats (Georgia) politicians

References

External links
Official website

2009 establishments in Georgia (country)
Alliance of Liberals and Democrats for Europe Party member parties
Centrist parties in Asia
Centrist parties in Europe
Liberal parties in Georgia (country)
Political parties established in 2009
Political parties in Georgia (country)
Pro-European political parties in Georgia (country)